Leonard Adolph Szafaryn (January 19, 1928 – September 22, 1990) was an American football offensive lineman in the National Football League for the Washington Redskins, Green Bay Packers, and the Philadelphia Eagles.  He played college football at the University of North Carolina and was drafted in the third round of the 1949 NFL Draft.

1928 births
1990 deaths
American football offensive linemen
Players of American football from Pennsylvania
Green Bay Packers players
North Carolina Tar Heels football players
Philadelphia Eagles players
Sportspeople from Pennsylvania
Washington Redskins players